Altja is a village in Haljala Parish, Lääne-Viru County, in northern Estonia, on the territory of Lahemaa National Park.

Gallery

References

Villages in Lääne-Viru County